The Croatian Six (consisting of Max Bebic, Vic Brajkovic, Tony Zvirotic, Joe Kokotovic, his brother Ilija Kokotovic and Mile Nekic) were six Croatian-Australian men sentenced to 15 years jail in 1981 for a conspiracy to bomb several targets in Sydney, including a Yugoslavian travel agent, the former Elizabethan Theatre in Newtown and a major water supply line in St Marys in western Sydney. The trial was one of the longest in Australian legal history. An appeal for these convictions and sentences failed, and the men were subsequently imprisoned for 15 years before being released.

Media investigations since the trial, such as for the ABC's Four Corners programme and The Sydney Morning Herald newspaper, suggested that much of the evidence on which the six were charged was fabricated and that the men were set up as part a sting operation by the Yugoslav foreign intelligence service, UDBA. Intelligence sources later confirmed that Dr Georgi Trajkovski, the Yugoslav Consul General in Melbourne, was a UDBA operative and a key player in the Croatian Six set up. Disgraced former detective Roger Rogerson, one of the arresting officers; later admitted that planting evidence during the 1970s and 80s was part of police culture.
 
The case also drew attention from John Schindler, then at the US Naval War College, who claimed that the Croatian Six affair was "a 'classic' agent provocateur operation run by the intelligence agency of the then communist regime in Belgrade, known as the UDBA, against exile communities that were against the Yugoslavian federation." He also claimed that former UDBA officials said that the Croatian Six case was "one of their great successes" in completely discrediting the Croatian Australian community. According to Schindler, Australian Security Intelligence Organisation would have (or at least should have) been aware of UDBA's involvement.

Ian Cunliffe, formerly a senior lawyer in the Department of Prime Minister and Cabinet, claimed intelligence material was withheld that would have resulted in not guilty verdicts for the Croatian Six. This material was purposely kept from then Prime Minister Malcolm Fraser and subpoenas by defence lawyers in the trial were not allowed on "national security grounds".

In 2012, three of the surviving five men — Max Bebic, Mile Nekic and Vic Brajkovic — represented by human rights lawyer Sebastian De Brennan, applied to the NSW Supreme Court for a judicial review of their convictions. This application was dismissed, however in August 2022 the NSW Supreme Court ordered a review into the convictions based on the declassification of relevant ASIO documents

References

Prisoners and detainees of the Commonwealth of Australia
1981 in Australia